The 2019 World Draughts Championship at the international draughts was held from September 15 to October 3, 2019, in Yamoussoukro, Ivory Coast under the auspices International Draughts Federation FMJD. Twenty players competed in the tournament, which play as a round-robin. The winning prize for the tournament was 20,000 euros.

World Champion 2016 and 2018 Roel Boomstra did not play in the World Championship.

With his title Alexander Georgiev became World Draughts Champion for the tenth time, equaling Alexei Chizhov.

Participants

Reserve

 Jan Groenendijk (Netherlands)
 Alexander Baljakin (Netherlands)
 Anatoli Gantvarg (Belarus)
 Alexander Getmanski (Russia)
 Vadim Virny (Germany)
 Yuri Anikeev (Ukraine)

Rules and regulations
The games were played in the official FMJD time rate of the Fischer system with 1 hour and 20 minutes for the game plus 1 minute per move. Conforming to the FMJD regulations, players are not allowed to agree on a draw before they both made 40 moves. If they do so nevertheless, the referee is obliged to decide on a 0-point each players.

The final classification was based on the total points obtained. If two or more players will have same total points to define the places:

 the largest number of victories
 the best results between this players
 the best results obtained in order of the classification.

Final standings

Results by round

Round 1
Start: 2019–09–15 at 13:30
  Alexey Chizhov –  Kpangni Jacques Aka 1–1
  Alexander Shvartsman –  Guntis Valneris 1–1
  Alexander Georgiev –  Ndiaga Samb 1–1
  Ivan Trofimov –  Otgonbileg Tserenbyamba 2–0
  Nicolay Germogenov –  Landry Nga 1–1
  Michael Semianiuk –  Jan Groenendijk 1–1
  Martijn Van Ijzendoorn –  Jitse Slump 1–1
  Kassim Souare –  Ahmed Sanogo 1–1
  Allan Igor Morena Silva –  N’cho Joel Atse 1–1
  Pan Yiming –  Guno Burleson 2–0

Round 2 
Start: 2019–09–16 at 13:30
  Kpangni Jacques Aka –  Guno Burleson 1–1
  N’cho Joel Atse –  Pan Yiming 1–1
  Ahmed Sanogo –  Allan Igor Morena Silva 0–2
  Jitse Slump –  Kassim Souare 2–0
  Jan Groenendijk –  Martijn Van Ijzendoorn 1–1
  Landry Nga –  Michael Semianiuk 1–1
  Otgonbileg Tserenbyamba –  Nicolay Germogenov 1–1
  Ndiaga Samb –  Ivan Trofimov 0–2
  Guntis Valneris –  Alexander Georgiev 1–1
  Alexey Chizhov –  Alexander Shvartsman 1–1

Round 3 
Start: 2019–09–17 at 13:30
  Alexander Shvartsman –  Kpangni Jacques Aka 2–0
  Alexander Georgiev –  Alexey Chizhov 2–0
  Ivan Trofimov –  Guntis Valneris 1–1
  Nicolay Germogenov –  Ndiaga Samb 1–1
  Michael Semianiuk –  Otgonbileg Tserenbyamba 1–1
  Martijn Van Ijzendoorn –  Landry Nga 1–1
  Kassim Souare –  Jan Groenendijk 1–1
  Allan Igor Morena Silva –  Jitse Slump 1–1
  Pan Yiming –  Ahmed Sanogo 2–0
  Guno Burleson –  N’cho Joel Atse 0–2

Round 4 
Start: 2019–09–18 at 13:30
  Kpangni Jacques Aka –  N’cho Joel Atse 0–2
  Ahmed Sanogo –  Guno Burleson 1–1
  Jitse Slump –  Pan Yiming 1–1
  Jan Groenendijk –  Allan Igor Morena Silva 2–0
  Landry Nga –  Kassim Souare 1–1
  Otgonbileg Tserenbyamba –  Martijn Van Ijzendoorn 1–1
  Ndiaga Samb –  Michael Semianiuk 1–1
  Guntis Valneris –  Nicolay Germogenov 2–0
  Alexander Shvartsman –  Alexander Georgiev 1–1
  Alexey Chizhov –  Ivan Trofimov 1–1

Round 5 
Start: 2019–09–19 at 09:30
  Alexander Georgiev –  Kpangni Jacques Aka 2–0
  Ivan Trofimov –  Alexander Shvartsman 0–2
  Nicolay Germogenov –  Alexey Chizhov 1–1
  Michael Semianiuk –  Guntis Valneris 0–2
  Martijn Van Ijzendoorn –  Ndiaga Samb 1–1
  Kassim Souare –  Otgonbileg Tserenbyamba 2–0
  Allan Igor Morena Silva –  Landry Nga 0–2
  Pan Yiming –  Jan Groenendijk 1–1
  Guno Burleson –  Jitse Slump 1–1
  N’cho Joel Atse –  Ahmed Sanogo 2–0

Round 6 
Start: 2019–09–18 at 15:30
  Kpangni Jacques Aka –  Ahmed Sanogo 1–1
  Jitse Slump –  N’cho Joel Atse 1–1
  Jan Groenendijk –  Guno Burleson 2–0
  Landry Nga –  Pan Yiming 0–2
  Otgonbileg Tserenbyamba –  Allan Igor Morena Silva 0–2
  Ndiaga Samb –  Kassim Souare 1–1
  Guntis Valneris –  Martijn Van Ijzendoorn 1–1
  Alexey Chizhov –  Michael Semianiuk 1–1
  Alexander Shvartsman –  Nicolay Germogenov 2–0
  Alexander Georgiev –  Ivan Trofimov 2–0

Round 7 
Start: 2019–09–21 at 13:30
  Ivan Trofimov –  Kpangni Jacques Aka 1–1
  Nicolay Germogenov –  Alexander Georgiev 1–1
  Michael Semianiuk –  Alexander Shvartsman 1–1
  Martijn Van Ijzendoorn –  Alexey Chizhov 0–2
  Kassim Souare –  Guntis Valneris 1–1
  Allan Igor Morena Silva –  Ndiaga Samb 2–0
  Pan Yiming –  Otgonbileg Tserenbyamba 2–0
  Guno Burleson –  Landry Nga 1–1
  N’cho Joel Atse –  Jan Groenendijk 0–2
  Ahmed Sanogo –  Jitse Slump 2–0

Round 8 
Start: 2019–09–22 at 13:30
  Kpangni Jacques Aka –  Jitse Slump 2–0
  Jan Groenendijk –  Ahmed Sanogo 2–0
  Landry Nga –  N’cho Joel Atse 1–1
  Otgonbileg Tserenbyamba –  Guno Burleson 1–1
  Ndiaga Samb –  Pan Yiming 1–1
  Guntis Valneris –  Allan Igor Morena Silva 2–0
  Alexey Chizhov –  Kassim Souare 1–1
  Alexander Shvartsman –  Martijn Van Ijzendoorn 1–1
  Alexander Georgiev –  Michael Semianiuk 2–0
  Ivan Trofimov –  Nicolay Germogenov 0–2

Round 9 
Start: 2019–09–23 at 13:30
  Nicolay Germogenov –  Kpangni Jacques Aka 2–0
  Michael Semianiuk –  Ivan Trofimov 1–1
  Martijn Van Ijzendoorn –  Alexander Georgiev 1–1
  Kassim Souare –  Alexander Shvartsmanс
  Allan Igor Morena Silva –  Alexey Chizhov 1–1
  Pan Yiming –  Guntis Valneris 1–1
  Guno Burleson –  Ndiaga Samb 0–2
  N’cho Joel Atse –  Otgonbileg Tserenbyamba 1–1
  Ahmed Sanogo –  Landry Ngaс
  Jitse Slump –  Jan Groenendijk 1–1

Round 10 
Start: 2019–09–24 at 13:30
  Kpangni Jacques Aka –  Jan Groenendijk 0–2
  Landry Nga –  Jitse Slump 1–1
  Otgonbileg Tserenbyamba –  Ahmed Sanogo 0–2
  Ndiaga Samb –  N’cho Joel Atse 1–1
  Guntis Valneris –  Guno Burleson 2–0
  Alexey Chizhov –  Pan Yiming 1–1
  Alexander Shvartsman –  Allan Igor Morena Silva 1–1
  Alexander Georgiev –  Kassim Souare 2–0
  Ivan Trofimov –  Martijn Van Ijzendoorn 1–1
  Nicolay Germogenov –  Michael Semianiuk 1–1

Round 11
Start: 2019–09–25 at 09:30
  Michael Semianiuk –  Kpangni Jacques Aka 1–1
  Martijn Van Ijzendoorn –  Nicolay Germogenov 2–0
  Kassim Souare –  Ivan Trofimov 1–1
  Allan Igor Morena Silva –  Alexander Georgiev 1–1
  Pan Yiming –  Alexander Shvartsman 1–1
  Guno Burleson –  Alexey Chizhov 1–1
  N’cho Joel Atse –  Guntis Valneris 1–1
  Ahmed Sanogo –  Ndiaga Samb 0–2
  Jitse Slump –  Otgonbileg Tserenbyamba 2–0
  Jan Groenendijk –  Landry Nga 1–1

Round 12
Start: 2019–09–25 at 15:30
  Kpangni Jacques Aka –  Landry Nga 1–1
  Otgonbileg Tserenbyamba –  Jan Groenendijk 0–2
  Ndiaga Samb –  Jitse Slump 0–2
  Guntis Valneris –  Ahmed Sanogo 2–0
  Alexey Chizhov –  N’cho Joel Atse 1–1
  Alexander Shvartsman –  Guno Burleson 1–1
  Alexander Georgiev –  Pan Yiming 1–1
  Ivan Trofimov –  Allan Igor Morena Silva 0–2
  Nicolay Germogenov –  Kassim Souare 0–2
  Michael Semianiuk –  Martijn Van Ijzendoorn 1–1

Round 13
Start: 2019–09–27 at 13:30
  Martijn Van Ijzendoorn –  Kpangni Jacques Aka 2–0
  Kassim Souare –  Michael Semianiuk 2–0
  Allan Igor Morena Silva –  Nicolay Germogenov 1–1
  Pan Yiming –  Ivan Trofimov 2–0
  Guno Burleson –  Alexander Georgiev 0–2
  N’cho Joel Atse –  Alexander Shvartsman 1–1
  Ahmed Sanogo –  Alexey Chizhov 1–1
  Jitse Slump –  Guntis Valneris 1–1
  Jan Groenendijk –  Ndiaga Samb 1–1
  Landry Nga –  Otgonbileg Tserenbyamba 0–2

Round 14
Start: 2019–09–28 at 13:30
  Kpangni Jacques Aka –  Otgonbileg Tserenbyamba 0–2
  Ndiaga Samb –  Landry Nga 0–2
  Guntis Valneris –  Jan Groenendijk 1–1
  Alexey Chizhov –  Jitse Slump 1–1
  Alexander Shvartsman –  Ahmed Sanogo 2–0
  Alexander Georgiev –  N’cho Joel Atse 2–0
  Ivan Trofimov –  Guno Burleson 1–1
  Nicolay Germogenov –  Pan Yiming 1–1
  Michael Semianiuk –  Allan Igor Morena Silva 1–1
  Martijn Van Ijzendoorn –  Kassim Souare 2–0

Round 15
Start: 2019–09–29 at 13:30
  Kassim Souare –  Kpangni Jacques Aka 1–1
  Allan Igor Morena Silva –  Martijn Van Ijzendoorn 0–2
  Pan Yiming –  Michael Semianiuk 1–1
  Guno Burleson –  Nicolay Germogenov 1–1
  N’cho Joel Atse –  Ivan Trofimov 0–2
  Ahmed Sanogo –  Alexander Georgiev 0–2
  Jitse Slump –  Alexander Shvartsman 1–1
  Jan Groenendijk –  Alexey Chizhov 1–1
  Landry Nga –  Guntis Valneris 1–1
  Otgonbileg Tserenbyamba –  Ndiaga Samb 2–0

Round 16
Start: 2019–09–30 at 13:30
  Kpangni Jacques Aka –  Ndiaga Samb 1–1
  Guntis Valneris –  Otgonbileg Tserenbyamba 2–0
  Alexey Chizhov –  Landry Nga 2–0
  Alexander Shvartsman –  Jan Groenendijk 1–1
  Alexander Georgiev –  Jitse Slump 1–1
  Ivan Trofimov –  Ahmed Sanogo 2–0
  Nicolay Germogenov –  N’cho Joel Atse 0–2
  Michael Semianiuk –  Guno Burleson 0–2
  Martijn Van Ijzendoorn –  Pan Yiming 1–1
  Kassim Souare –  Allan Igor Morena Silva 1–1

Round 17
Start: 2019–10–01 at 13:30
  Allan Igor Morena Silva –  Kpangni Jacques Aka 1–1
  Pan Yiming –  Kassim Souare 2–0
  Guno Burleson –  Martijn Van Ijzendoorn 2–0
  N’cho Joel Atse –  Michael Semianiuk 1–1
  Ahmed Sanogo –  Nicolay Germogenov 1–1
  Jitse Slump –  Ivan Trofimov 1–1
  Jan Groenendijk –  Alexander Georgiev 1–1
  Landry Nga –  Alexander Shvartsman 1–1
  Otgonbileg Tserenbyamba –  Alexey Chizhov 0–2
  Ndiaga Samb –  Guntis Valneris 0–2

Round 18
Start: 2019–10–02 at 13:30
  Kpangni Jacques Aka –  Guntis Valneris 0–2
  Alexey Chizhov –  Ndiaga Samb 2–0
  Alexander Shvartsman –  Otgonbileg Tserenbyamba 2–0
  Alexander Georgiev –  Landry Nga 2–0
  Ivan Trofimov –  Jan Groenendijk 1–1
  Nicolay Germogenov –  Jitse Slump 1–1
  Michael Semianiuk –  Ahmed Sanogo 2–0
  Martijn Van Ijzendoorn –  N’cho Joel Atse 1–1
  Kassim Souare –  Guno Burleson 2–0
  Allan Igor Morena Silva –  Pan Yiming 0–2

Round 19
Start: 2019–10–03 at 09:30
  Pan Yiming –  Kpangni Jacques Aka 2–0
  Guno Burleson –  Allan Igor Morena Silva 1–1
  N’cho Joel Atse –  Kassim Souare 2–0
  Ahmed Sanogo –  Martijn Van Ijzendoorn 1–1
  Jitse Slump –  Michael Semianiuk 1–1
  Jan Groenendijk –  Nicolay Germogenov 1–1
  Landry Nga –  Ivan Trofimov 1–1
  Otgonbileg Tserenbyamba –  Alexander Georgiev 1–1
  Ndiaga Samb –  Alexander Shvartsman 1–1
  Guntis Valneris –  Alexey Chizhov 1–1

References

External links
 List of players
 Offiсial site
 World Championship 2019
 Results in toernooibase KNDB

Draughts world championships
2019 in draughts
2019 in Ivorian sport
Sport in Yamoussoukro
International sports competitions hosted by Ivory Coast
Draughts World Championship
Draughts World Championship